Consort Fang (died 20 September 1801), of the Han Chinese Chen clan, was a consort of Qianlong Emperor. She and her brothers were then inducted into the a bondservant company of the Bordered Yellow Banner of the Han Chinese Eight Banners since it was required for all consorts of Qing emperors to belong to one of the Eight Banners.

Life

Family background 
Consort Fang was a member of Han Chinese Chen clan. Her personal name wasn't recorded in history. Her ancestral home was located in Yangzhou.
 Father: Yanlun (延伦)
 Two elder brothers:
 First elder brother: Chen Ji (陈济)
 Second elder brother: Chen Hao (陈浩), a magistrate of Yangguan (扬关任事, pinyin: yangguan renshi) in 1778

Qianlong era 
Consort Fang was born between 1749 and 1753. She entered the palace in 1766 after Elegant Women Selection, and was given the title of “First Class Female Attendant Ming" (明常在; "ming" meaning "bright"). Her residence became the Palace of Eternal Longevity in the Forbidden City. As a lower-ranking imperial concubine, she lived under the supervision of Concubine Shun and Consort Shu. In 1775, lady Chen was promoted to "Noble Lady Ming" (明贵人). She was accused by Empress Dowager Chongqing of harming imperial child and demoted to "First Class Female Attendant Ming" (明常在). In 1780, she was restored as "Noble Lady Ming" (明贵人). In 1794, she was promoted to "Concubine Fang" (芳嫔; "fang" meaning "fragrant"), and moved to Palace of Peace and Harmony on the east side of the Forbidden city.

Jiaqing era 
In 1798, Emperor Qianlong promoted Lady Chen to "Consort Fang" (芳妃). Consort Fang died in 1801 and was interred at Yu Mausoleum in the Eastern Qing tombs.

Titles 
 During the reign of the Qianlong Emperor (r. 1735–1796):
 Lady Chen (from unknown date)
 First Class Female Attendant Ming (from 1766), seventh rank consort
 Noble Lady Ming (/明贵人; from 1775), sixth rank consort
 First Class Female Attendant Ming (from unknown date), seventh rank consort
 Noble Lady Ming (from 1780), sixth rank consort
 Concubine Fang (from 1794), fifth rank consort
 During the reign of the Jiaqing Emperor (r. 1796–1820):
 Consort Fang (from 1798), fourth rank consort

See also
 Ranks of imperial consorts in China#Qing
 Royal and noble ranks of the Qing dynasty

References 

1801 deaths
18th-century Chinese women
Consorts of the Qianlong Emperor
People from Beijing